The Archi District, also known as Dasht-i-Archi is situated in the northeastern part of Kunduz Province in Afghanistan. It borders with Khan Abad and Kunduz districts to the south-west, Imam Sahib District to the north-west, Tajikistan to the north and Takhar Province to the east.

The population is 74,900 (2006) - 40% Pashtun, 15% Tajik, 35% Uzbek, and 10% Turkmen.

The district center is the town of Archi, located in the northern part of the district.

The district is generally poor and seriously affected during the wars.

References 

 District profile

External links 

 AIMS District Map

Districts of Kunduz Province